This is a list of the bats of Borneo.

Bats of Sarawak
Rousettus amplexicaudatus: Baram, Niah
Rousettus spinalatus: Niah, Bintulu, Lambir NP, Simulajau NP
Pteropus vampyrus: coastal, interior
Pteropus hypomelanus: off coast island
Cynopterus brachyotis:  lowland to 1600m
Cynopterus sphinx: not recorded in Sarawak
Cynopterus horsfieldi: Gading NP, Lundu, Kubah NP
Penthetor lucasi: Wind Cave, Kubah NP, Gading NP, Samunsam WS, Tg Datu NP, Balui, Mulu NP, Bako NP
Megaerops ecaudatus: Kelabit, Penrisen Height
Megaerops wetmorei:  not recorded in Sarawak
Dycopterus spadiceus: Pueh foot, Kubah NP, Baram, Niah, Sibu
Chironax melanocephalus: recently recorded in Kubah NP, Samunsam, Lambir NP, Loagan Bunut NP
Balionycteris maculata: Kuching, Kubah NP, Gading, Padawan, Mulu, Niah, Dulit, Bario, Lambir.
Aethalops alecto: Mulu NP, Kelabit, Murud, Penrisen Height
Eonycteris spelaea: Kubah NP, Gading, Kuching, Niah, Tinjar
Eonycteris major: Kuching, Dulit, Penrisen Height
Macroglossus minimus: Bako NP, Kelabit, Niah NP
Cheiromeles torquatus: Niah NP

Bats of Sabah
Rousettus amplexicaudatus: Balembangan, Sukau, Madai, Tawau
Rousettus spinalatus: Sukau, Kuamut
Pteropus vampyrus: coastal
Pteropus hypomelanus: off coast island
Cynopterus brachyotis : lowland to 1600m
Cynopterus sphinx: no record
Cynopterus horsfieldi: Kinabalu, Gomantong
Penthetor lucasi: Gomantong, Kuamut, Sapulut
Megaerops ecaudatus: Danum, Tawau, Tenom
Megaerops wetmorei: no record
Dycopterus spadiceus: Sepilok, Baturong Cave
Chironax melanocephalus: Sepilok
Balionycteris maculata: Poring, Kota Kinabalu, Madai, Tawau, Poring
Aethalops alecto: Kinabalu, Crocker
Eonycteris spelaea: Gomantong, Sukau, Segama, Madai
Eonycteris major: Kota Kinabalu, Ranau
Macroglossus minimus: Kota Kinabalu, Witti Range, Sepilok, Sukau, Tawau, Poring

Bats of Brunei
Rousettus amplexicaudatus: unknown localities
Rousettus spinalatus: not recorded
Pteropus vampyrus: lowland areas
Pteropus hypomelanus: no record
Cynopterus brachyotis : lowland to 1600m
Cynopterus sphinx: no record
Cynopterus horsfieldi: no record
Penthetor lucasi: lowland
Megaerops ecaudatus: unknown localities
Megaerops wetmorei: Andulau, Benutan Dam-site, Sungai Beruang, Tasek Merimbun and Ulu Temburung.
Dycopterus spadiceus: unknown localities
Chironax melanocephalus: Ulu Temburong
Balionycteris maculata: unknown localities
Aethalops alecto: upland areas
Eonycteris spelaea:  unknown localities
Eonycteris major: no record
Macroglossus minimus: most areas

References 

'
'Borneo